Linnebäck is a locality situated in Karlskoga Municipality, Örebro County, Sweden with 136 inhabitants in 2015.

References 

Populated places in Karlskoga Municipality